Iron Solomon is an American battle rapper, producer, and songwriter from New York City. Solomon dropped his debut album "Monster" March 27, 2012 via Duck Down Music Inc. to lackluster reviews and sales. On Saturday December 9, 2017, Iron Solomon battled Rum Nitty at SMACK Vol.1. Throughout his career, Solomon has battled Jin, Murda Mook, Daylyt, Illmaculate, The Saurus, E Ness, Dizaster, Charlie Clips, B Magic and more. His father is film score composer Robbie Merkin.

References

External links
Iron Solomon on Twitter
YouTube Channel Page
Iron Solomon battle rap profile on Rap Grid

Underground rappers
Living people
American rappers
21st-century American rappers
Year of birth missing (living people)